Heggen and Frøland District Court is a district court located in Mysen, Norway.  It covers the municipalities of Eidsberg, Askim, Spydeberg, Trøgstad, Marker, Rømskog, Hobøl and Skiptvet]  and is subordinate Borgarting Court of Appeal.

References

External links 
Official site 

Defunct district courts of Norway
Organisations based in Mysen